Roger Clark (born July 14, 1978) is an Irish-American actor and voice actor. He is best known for portraying Arthur Morgan through performance capture in the 2018 video game Red Dead Redemption 2.

Early life
Clark was born in New Jersey on July 14, 1978, the son of an Irish mother and an Irish-American father. The family spent each summer vacationing in his mother's hometown of Sligo. When he was 12 years old, the family permanently moved to Sligo, where he completed his Leaving Certificate. He later moved to Wales to study theatre, media, and drama at the University of Glamorgan. After living and working in London for a number of years, he relocated to New York City in the early 2010s.

Career
Clark provided the performance capture for Arthur Morgan, the protagonist of the 2018 video game Red Dead Redemption 2. His performance earned him numerous awards and nominations. He also has a successful career onstage and has narrated over 50 audiobooks.

Personal life
Clark married his wife, Molly, on April 25, 2011. They have two sons, Colin and Ruari. Colin, born on February 18, 2013, is on the autism spectrum.

Filmography

Film

Television

Video games

Awards and honours

References

External links

Living people
1978 births
21st-century American male actors
American expatriates in Ireland
American male film actors
American male television actors
American male video game actors
American male voice actors
Male actors from New Jersey
American people of Irish descent
The Game Awards winners